John Ordronaux (16 December 1778 – 24 August 1841) was one of the most successful privateers of the War of 1812 between the United States and the United Kingdom of Great Britain and Ireland. During the war he commanded two ships, Marengo, then Prince de Neufchatel. With these he captured or destroyed about thirty British merchant ships, outran about seventeen British warships and brought back goods to the US worth between $250,000 and $300,000.

First command: Marengo 
Ordronaux was born at Nantes, Brittany, France to a French merchant skipper, John Ordronaux (senior) and an English mother, Joanna Hammond from the city of Hull, England. At the outbreak of the war on 18 June 1812, he commanded the French privateer Marengo which had been outfitted in New York City in November 1811. His patron was a French lady called Florye Charretton, who was allegedly a Parisian woman of considerable wealth.

On 23 June 1812 Marengo was in New London and being watched by the British 36-gun frigate  (Captain Richard Byron). This prize was sent into New York on 10 August 1812. Marengo then went on to take the brigantines Eliza (Captain Sullivan) of Guernsey, and Lady Provost (Captain Jennings) of Halifax, Nova Scotia. This document suggests that Ordronaux was a gentleman and that he treated his prisoners of war sympathetically. It describes him handing over eighteen named prisoners to the British Consul at Fayal in the Azores Islands on 17 August 1812. The prisoners included two masters and three mates and an exchange was made for the same number of American prisoners of war. Jacques Bidois is named as the commander of Marengo in this document but he is thought to have been Ordronaux's mate at this time. In mid October 1812, Bidois is listed as master of Marengo in a book which also records her as having only six guns and a crew of fifty men. So her three captured prizes must have seemed a considerable success.

On 29 August 1812 Marengo captured the British brigantine Concord (Captain Taylor) between Tenerife and Fuerteventura according to Lloyd's List Marine Collection. Concord was taken to New York to auction as a prize Captain Taylor said in court evidence that he was allowed to mess with Marengo's officers on this trans-Atlantic voyage providing further evidence that her crew acted in a gentlemanly way to her prisoners. On arrival in New York the neutral Spanish owners of part of Concord'''s cargo of wine sued Florye Charretton and Ordronaux for the loss of their property and the 190 or so pages of court documents that have survived in the US archives provide much information about the effect of privateering on mercantile trade in this period.

Because of his involvement in this litigation and in arranging for the sale by auction of his prizes and their cargoes, Ordronaux was inactive as a privateer for approximately the next twelve months.Prize and related records of the District Courts of the United States – Record Group 21, M855, US Circuit Court – Southern District of New York, Roll 2, Case 36 – Florye Charetton & crew of Privateer Marengo v. Brig. Eliza, 1813. The sale of Concord alone raised the sum of $24,409. This was shared between her owners and each named member of her crew in proportions given in the surviving court documents. But most significantly, Ordronaux now had sufficient funds to buy a ship of his own.

 Second command: Prince de Neufchatel 

The response of the British to the successes of the small, early American privateers was to defend their ships more heavily. So during 1813 a number of ship builders on the East coast of the US built larger, faster, more heavily armed privateering vessels. Now enriched by his prize winnings and supported by his patron, Mme Charretton, Ordronaux purchased one of this new breed of ships, the Prince de Neufchatel, which was constructed in New York between 1812 and 1813 by the firm of Adam and Noah Brown to a design attributed to Christian Bergh. On 28 October 1813, he took command of the Prince de Neufchatel,  and showing considerable skill, sailed her to Cherbourg virtually unarmed, arriving there on 27 January 1814 for fitting out.  Showing further panache, Ordronaux managed to capture his next prize Hazard (Captain John Anderson) on 18 January, before his ship was properly fitted out.

After fitting out and arming with eighteen guns (compared to Marengo's six) Ordronaux undertook his first cruise from Cherbourg into the English Channel in early March 1814. Incurring the fury of Lloyd's List Ordronaux captured six British vessels sending the valuable ones into French ports and burning the rest, despite constant harassment by the Royal Navy ships  and HMS Sybille.

Ordronaux's next cruise was his most successful taking him along the coast of Portugal and back to the English Channel from July 1814. On returning to Baltimore, USA in October 1814 the Baltimore Patriot of the 24th of that month printed an extract of Ordronaux's log which showed that he had captured no less than twenty prizes since July.

 Battle with HMS Endymion 
Ordronaux's most famous accomplishment took place in the fall of 1814. The Prince de Neufchatel was making her first privateering cruise out of a U.S. port with a very small crew of 33 men. Four days out of Boston, she captured the English merchantmen Douglass and took it under tow. Of this battle, Captain Henry Hope of the HMS Endymion said, "the extraordinary feature of this affair lies in the fact that a vessel fitted out at private expense actually frustrated the utmost endeavours of an English frigate, of vastly superior force in guns and men, to capture the privateer. We lost as many men in our efforts to seize the Prince de Neufchâtel as we would have done had my ship engaged a regular man-or-war of equal force. The people in the privateer conducted their defence in the most heroic and skilful manner."

 Capture of Prince de Neufchatel Prince de Neufchatel was eventually captured by the British frigate  on 28 December 1814, having brought to the United States goods worth between $250,000 and $300,000, and outrun seventeen British warships due to her superior speed and seamanship. The vessel's Letter of Marque (from the US Government), Registry Certificate and Muster Roll were found on board and are now held by the UK National Archives. These name Ordronaux as one of the owners and Captain Nicholas Millin as master of the vessel since 12 December 1814. These records suggest that Ordronaux was not on board when Prince de Neufchatel was captured, and cannot be held responsible for its loss. Other documents in the UK National Archives relate to the interrogation of Benjamin Wells, a sailmaker on Prince, the consideration of the British Admiralty to take Prince into service with the Royal Navy, details of the sale of Prince as a prize, the captain's log of HMS Leander, and the "Head Money" papers of Prince de Neufchatel''.

Late life and death 

After the war, and now a rich man, Ordronaux settled in New York City in 1816 and married Jean Marie Elizabeth Charretton the daughter of his former patron. They had four daughters, all of whom married, and an unmarried son, John. After allegedly enjoying a second career in the sugar industry, he died at Cartagena, Colombia, South America in 1841. His body, while being transported home, is thought to have been thrown overboard by superstitious sailors when their ship nearly sank in a storm. In honor of the man, the World War II U.S. warship, was named after him.

References

External links 
 Extract from the ship's log of Prince de Neufchatel, July to September, 1814, as printed in the Baltimore Patriot of 24 October, 1814 – In McManemin, John. Captains of the privateers of the War of 1812. Ho-Ho-Kus Publishing Company, 1994.
  Documents about Prince de Neufchatel in the possession of the UK National Archives
 Drawing of Prince de Neufchatel in the UK National Maritime Museum
 The battle with HMS Endymion in: Maclay, E.S., A History of American Privateers, New York, 1899
 Another account of the battle with HMS Endymion in: Coggeshall, G., A History of American Privateers and Letters of Marque, Third Edition, New York, 1861.

French emigrants to the United States
American privateers
1778 births
1841 deaths